Hans Svarstad (11 July 1883 – 1 April 1971) was a Norwegian politician for the Christian Democratic Party.

He was born in Innvik.

He was elected to the Norwegian Parliament from Hordaland in 1937, and was re-elected on two occasions.

Svarstad was a member of Kvam municipality council from 1922 to 1931.

Outside politics he worked as a school teacher. He was the local churchwarden for twenty years, and was active in the temperance movement.

References

1883 births
1971 deaths
Christian Democratic Party (Norway) politicians
Members of the Storting
Hordaland politicians
20th-century Norwegian politicians